Stan Wawrinka was the defending champion, and successfully defended his title against Slovenian qualifier Aljaž Bedene, 6–3, 6–4. He did not lose a single set in the entire tournament.

Seeds
The top four seeds received a bye into the second round.

Draw

Finals

Top half

Bottom half

Qualifying

Seeds
The top seed received a bye into the second round.

Qualifiers

Qualifying draw

First qualifier

Second qualifier

Third qualifier

Fourth qualifier

References
 Main Draw
 Qualifying Draw

Singles